Centuria (plural centuriae) is a Latin term (from the stem centum meaning one hundred) denoting military units originally consisting of 100 men. The size of the century changed over time, and from the first century BC through most of the imperial era the standard size of a centuria was 80 men.

A centuria is also a Roman unit of land area corresponding to 100 heredia.

Roman use

Political
In the political context the centuria was the constituent voting unit in the assembly of the centuries (Latin comitia centuriata), an old form of popular assembly in the Roman Republic, the members of which cast one collective vote.

Its origin seems to be the homonymous military unit. The comitia centuriata elected important magistrates like consuls and praetors.

Military

History 
The centuria dates all the way back to the earliest armies of the Roman Kingdom being described in Plutarch's account of the life Romulus, however it is only mentioned in passing as a subdivision of Romulus' force. It is speculated that in this period a century may have referred to a Phalanx block and was perhaps the main tactical unit on the battlefield.

After the adoption of the manipular Roman army in 340 BC the centuria took a backseat to the maniple as the main military unit used by the Roman army. In Livy's The History of Rome and Polybius' Histories, centuria do not appear by name but both writers do mention subdivisions of the maniple of around 60 men that were commanded by Centurions. The only point of disagreement between the two was the number of these units in a maniple; Livy says 3 while Polybius says 2. Livy is writing of a time 150 years before Polybius so the number of men in this unit may have changed over that period.

The centuria was the pivotal tactical unit of a Roman legion after the Marian reforms of 107 BC.

Leadership and organization 
A century was commanded by a centurion, who was assisted by an optio and  tesserarius. It had a banner or signum which was carried by a signifer. Also, each century provided a buccinator, who played a buccina, a kind of horn used to transmit acoustic orders.

On the battlefield, the centurion stood at the far right of the first row of men next to the signifer, while the optio stood at the rear, to avoid, if necessary, the disbanding of the troops and ensure the relay between typical closed order lines used by the Roman army.

The post-Marian Reform centuria originally consisted of a hundred soldiers; later 80 distributed among 10 contubernia, with support staff making up the remainder of the 100 men. Each contubernium (the minimal unit in the Roman legion) consisted of eight soldiers who lived in the same tent while on campaign or the same bunk room in barracks.

In the imperial period, but likely not the republican period, the first cohort  was twice the size of the other cohorts. Each of its five centuriae was a double centuria of 160 men (rather than 80). The first cohort thus consisted of 800 men. Centurions of these first-cohort double centuriae were called primi ordinis ("first rank"), except for the leader of the first centuria of the first cohort, who was referred to as primus pilus (first file).

Other uses 

The term centuria was later used during the Spanish Civil War to describe the informal bands of local militiamen and international volunteers that sprang up in Catalonia and Aragon in October–November 1936 and also today in Ukraine.

Sources

See also
Hundertschaft
Roman empire
Roman military history
Tactics of the Roman century in combat
Sotnia

Infantry units and formations of ancient Rome
Roman legions